The 4th congressional district of South Carolina is a congressional district in upstate South Carolina bordering North Carolina.  It includes parts of Greenville and Spartanburg counties.  The district includes the two major cities of Greenville and Spartanburg.

The district is one of the most conservative in the state.  In the late 20th century, it has been in Republican hands since 1979, aside from a six-year stint by Democrat Liz J. Patterson, the daughter of former Senator Olin Johnston.  Even before the Republicans finally took control of the seat, the 4th had been a rather conservative district. Like in most of the state, the old-line Southern Democrats began splitting their tickets as early as the 1940s.  However, this area's white conservatives became increasingly willing to support Republicans at the state and local level as early as the 1970s, well before the rest of the state swung Republican.  The district is a major destination for presidential candidates in election years, as South Carolina is one of the first states to hold a presidential primary.

Republican William Timmons has represented the district since January 3, 2019. He succeeded Republican Trey Gowdy who did not seek reelection.

History
From 2003 to 2013, the district included all of Spartanburg and Union counties and parts of Greenville and Laurens counties.

Greenville and Spartanburg Counties are the only in the district.

Election results from recent presidential races

List of members representing the district

Recent election results

2012

2014

2016

2018

2020

2022

See also 

South Carolina's congressional districts
List of United States congressional districts

Notes

References

Further reading
 
 
 Congressional Biographical Directory of the United States 1774–present

04
Greenville County
Laurens County
Spartanburg County
Union County